The following radio stations broadcast on FM frequency 93.5 MHz:

Argentina
 Antena 5 in Progreso, Santa Fe
 LRI367 in Colonia Josefina, Santa Fe
 LRM946 in San Vicente, Santa Fe
 Radio Del Plata (Rosario) in Rosario, Santa Fe
 Radio María in Caseros, Buenos Aires
 Radio María in Monte Caseros, Corrientes

Australia
 TLCFM Lower Clarence Community Radio in Yamba, New South Wales
 2DBO in Dubbo, New South Wales
 3BBO in Bendigo, Victoria
 3RPH Warragul in Latrobe Valley, Victoria
 4ROK in Gladstone, Queensland
 2SNO in Goulburn, New South Wales

Canada (Channel 228)
 CBCL-FM in London, Ontario
 CBGA-8-FM in Iles-de-la-Madeleine, Quebec
 CBKF-FM-3 in Zenon Park, Saskatchewan
 CBM-FM in Montreal, Quebec
 CBUZ-FM in Chetwynd, British Columbia
 CFXJ-FM in Toronto, Ontario
 CFZN-FM in Haliburton, Ontario
 CHLA-FM in Whitehorse, Yukon
 CHMR-FM in St. John's, Newfoundland and Labrador
 CHYL-FM in York Landing, Manitoba
 CIEL-FM-5 in Sully, Quebec
 CIGM-FM in Sudbury, Ontario
 CIHS-FM in Wetaskiwin, Alberta
 CIKX-FM in Grand Falls, New Brunswick
 CIST-FM in St. Theresa Point, Manitoba
 CIWR-FM in Waterhen, Manitoba
 CJAS-FM in St-Augustin, Quebec
 CJDR-FM-1 in Sparwood, British Columbia
 CJEL-FM in Winkler/Morden, Manitoba
 CJLS-FM-1 in New Tusket, Nova Scotia
 CJLY-FM in Nelson, British Columbia
 CJKS-FM in Oshweken, Ontario
 CKBM-FM in Brochet, Manitoba
 CKPR-FM-2 in Atikokan, Ontario
 CKSB-7-FM in Kenora, Ontario
 CKUM-FM in Moncton, New Brunswick
 CKVH-FM in High Prairie, Alberta
 CKXC-FM in Kingston, Ontario
 CKXO-FM in Chibougamau, Quebec
 CKZX-FM in New Denver, British Columbia
 VF2174 in God's Lake Narrows, Alberta
 VF2195 in Cross Lake, Manitoba
 VF2203 in Kemano, British Columbia
 VF2316 in Avola, British Columbia
 VF2334 in Fox Lake First Nation, Manitoba
 VF2335 in Lake Manitoba, Manitoba
 VF2336 in Griswold, Manitoba
 VF2337 in Easterville, Manitoba
 VF2340 in Hollow Water, Manitoba
 VF2342 in Sherridon, Manitoba
 VF2402 in Kattiniq, Quebec
 VF2404 in Jackhead, Manitoba
 VF2405 in Pauingassi, Manitoba
 VF2406 in Leaf Rapids, Manitoba
 VF2411 in Loon Lake, Saskatchewan
 VF2421 in Dauphin River, Manitoba

China 
 CNR The Voice of China in Fuzhou, Hefei and Chenzhou
 CNR Business Radio in Shenyang and Yumen

India
 Red FM (India) in Delhi, Mumbai, Kolkata
 Suryan FM 93.5 in Chennai and 44 other cities

Japan
 JOIR-FM in Sendai, Miyagi
 NBC RADIO SAGA in Saga

Mexico
XHBAL-FM in San Cristóbal de las Casas, Chiapas
XHCAT-FM in Catemaco, Veracruz
XHEJ-FM in Puerto Vallarta, Jalisco
XHEVAB-FM in Valle de Bravo, Estado de México
XHLAZ-FM in Tamaliagua, Jalisco
XHLU-FM in Ciudad Serdán, Puebla
XHNY-FM in Irapuato, Guanajuato
XHO-FM in Matamoros, Tamaulipas
XHPHOL-FM in Holbox, Quintana Roo
XHPP-FM in Pánuco, Veracruz
 XHPPO-FM in Puerto Peñasco, Sonora
XHPTLM-FM in Tulúm, Quintana Roo
XHQC-FM in Saltillo, Coahuila

Netherlands
 Radio Barneveld in Barneveld

Philippines
DXQR in Cagayan de Oro
DYEY in Boracay
DYMK-FM in Iloilo City
DWAC-FM in Naga City
DWTL in Dagupan City
DWTY in Olongapo City
DYTY in Tacloban City

Taiwan 
 Transfers CNR The Voice of China in parts of Hsinchu, Matsu, Taipei and Taoyuan

Trinidad and Tobago
 Hott 93 in Trinidad

United Kingdom

England
BBC Radio 4 at Wrotham, Kent

Tristan da Cunha
Atlantic FM

United States (Channel 228)
  in Logandale, Nevada
 KALQ-FM in Alamosa, Colorado
  in Forrest City, Arkansas
  in Corning, Arkansas
  in Hudson, Iowa
  in Redondo Beach, California
 KDEY-FM in Ontario, California
 KDGS in Andover, Kansas
  in Ester, Alaska
 KDVY in Crockett, Texas
 KFDP-LP in Bloomfield, New Mexico
 KGWT in George West, Texas
 KIKT in Cooper, Texas
 KIPI in Eagle Butte, South Dakota
 KITN (FM) in Worthington, Minnesota
  in Leesville, Louisiana
 KJAX in Jackson, Wyoming
 KJOC in Bettendorf, Iowa
  in Twain Harte, California
 KKDT in Burdett, Kansas
  in Burlington, Iowa
  in Columbus, Nebraska
  in Glasgow, Montana
  in Parsons, Kansas
 KLMR-FM in Lamar, Colorado
 KLXE in Calhoun, Louisiana
 KLXK in Breckenridge, Texas
  in Willits, California
 KNCE in Taos, New Mexico
 KOCA-LP in Laramie, Wyoming
 KOMT in Lakeview, Arkansas
 KORV in Lakeview, Oregon
 KOZI-FM in Chelan, Washington
  in Lahaina, Hawaii
 KPPM-LP in Lake Charles, Louisiana
 KPRO in Altus, Oklahoma
 KPWA in Bismarck, Arkansas
 KQAV in Rosamond, California
  in Lihue, Hawaii
 KREO in James Town, Wyoming
 KRMS-FM in Osage Beach, Missouri
  in Tarkio, Missouri
  in Marfa, Texas
  in Benson, Minnesota
  in Show Low, Arizona
 KSTQ in Stuart, Oklahoma
 KTND in Aspen, Colorado
 KWCQ in Condon, Oregon
 KWDC-LP in Stockton, California
 KWDR (FM) in Royal City, Washington
  in Ruidoso, New Mexico
 KWUS-LP in Clarksville, Tennessee
 KXCD in Fairfield, Idaho
 KYKK in Junction, Texas
  in Paxton, Nebraska
 KZWF-LP in Wichita Falls, Texas
 KZXT in Eureka, Montana
  in Columbia, Kentucky
  in Columbia, South Carolina
 WAWR in Remsen, New York
  in Big Stone Gap, Virginia
  in Blackstone, Virginia
 WBCM in Boyne City, Michigan
  in Belle Glade, Florida
  in Barnesville, Ohio
 WCCA-LP in Scottsville, Virginia
 WCTB in Fairfield, Maine
  in Allendale, South Carolina
 WDPJ-LP in Danville, Kentucky
 WEEY in Swanzey, New Hampshire
 WFBY in Buckhannon, West Virginia
 WFDZ in Perry, Florida
 WFRQ in Harwich Port, Massachusetts
 WGEE in New London, Wisconsin
 WGLN-LP in Cedar Lake, Michigan
 WGYJ-LP in Atmore, Alabama
  in Clinton, Mississippi
  in Howell, Michigan
 WITW-LP in Valparaiso, Indiana
 WJFT-LP in Sanford, North Carolina
 WJJS in Salem, Virginia
 WKBQ in Covington, Tennessee
  in Lafayette, Indiana
 WKIL-LP in Elkhart, Indiana
 WKLV-FM in Butler, Alabama
  in Hancock, Michigan
  in Savannah, Tennessee
 WKZX-FM in Lenoir City, Tennessee
 WLGR in Warrensburg, New York
 WLKE in Gallitzin, Pennsylvania
 WLQB in Ocean Isle Beach, North Carolina
 WLYD in Chandler, Indiana
 WMDA-LP in Memphis, Tennessee
  in Brandenburg, Kentucky
 WMPK in Summit, Mississippi
  in Harrison, Tennessee
 WMRG in Morgan, Georgia
  in Conway, New Hampshire
 WMXQ in Hartford City, Indiana
 WPHH in Hope Hull, Alabama
 WPSA-LP in Portage, Wisconsin
  in Wellsville, New York
 WRDJ-LP in Merritt Island, Florida
 WRHW-LP in Murfreesboro, Tennessee
 WRHZ-LP in Three Oaks, Michigan
 WRLY-LP in Raleigh, North Carolina
 WRPO-LP in Russells Point, Ohio
  in Bowling Green, Ohio
  in Stroudsburg, Pennsylvania
 WSBL-LP in South Bend, Indiana
 WSJK in Tuscola, Illinois
 WSPP-LP in Hopkinsville, Kentucky
 WSRM in Coosa, Georgia
 WTKP in Port Saint Joe, Florida
 WTPA-FM in Mechanicsburg, Pennsylvania
 WTTZ-LP in Baltimore, Maryland
  in Ithaca, New York
 WVIP in New Rochelle, New York
 WVIV-FM in Lemont, Illinois
  in Hazlehurst, Georgia
 WVVI-FM in Christiansted, Virgin Islands
 WYAW-LP in Savannah, Georgia
  in Wadesboro, North Carolina
  in Millsboro, Delaware
  in Hudson, New York
 WZFL in Islamorada, Florida

References

Lists of radio stations by frequency